The Second Merkel cabinet (German: Kabinett Merkel II) was the Government of the Federal Republic of Germany during the 17th legislative session of the Bundestag. Installed after the 2009 federal election, it left office on 17 December 2013. It was preceded by the first Merkel cabinet and succeeded by the third Merkel cabinet. Led by Chancellor Angela Merkel, it was supported by a coalition of the Christian Democratic Union (CDU), the Christian Social Union of Bavaria (CSU), and the Free Democratic Party (FDP).

The cabinet served as a caretaker government following the elections on 22 September 2013; which saw the removal of the Free Democratic Party from the Bundestag. Negotiations between the Christian Democratic Union/Christian Social Union of Bavaria (CDU/CSU) and the Social Democratic Party (SPD) took place to form a new cabinet.

Composition

|}

Resignations, dismissals and replacements 
The second Merkel cabinet has been reshuffled several times. The first change occurred on 30 November 2009, when Franz Josef Jung resigned as Labour Minister amidst controversy surrounding the Kunduz airstrike, which happened while he was Defense Minister in the previous cabinet. He was succeeded by former Family Affairs Minister Ursula von der Leyen, who was in turn succeeded by Kristina Schröder.

On 3 March 2011, Karl-Theodor zu Guttenberg stepped down as Defense Minister following the discovery of plagiarized content in his doctoral dissertation. He was succeeded by former Interior Minister Thomas de Maizière, who was in turn succeeded by Hans-Peter Friedrich.

On 10 May 2011, Rainer Brüderle was elected as the FDP's parliamentary leader and resigned his position as Economics Minister. He was succeeded by former Health Minister Philipp Rösler, who was in turn succeeded by Daniel Bahr. On 13 May 2011, the FDP elected Rösler to succeed Guido Westerwelle as party chairman. Rösler was then named Vice Chancellor on 16 May 2011, succeeding Westerwelle in this position as well. Westerwelle retained the position of Foreign Minister.

On 16 May 2012, Merkel requested that President Joachim Gauck dismiss Environment Minister Norbert Röttgen after the CDU's defeat in the North Rhine-Westphalia state election. Röttgen had been CDU chairman for that state. He was dismissed on 22 May 2012 and was succeeded as Environment Minister by Peter Altmaier.

On 5 February 2013, Annette Schavan was stripped of her doctorate by the University of Düsseldorf due to alleged plagiarism in her PhD thesis. She resigned on 9 February 2013 and was succeeded by Johanna Wanka.

See also 
Cabinet of Germany

References

External links
Cabinet of Germany (English)
 Federal Ministries of Germany (English)

Merkel II
Merkel II
2009 establishments in Germany
Cabinets established in 2009
2013 disestablishments in Germany
Cabinets disestablished in 2013
Angela Merkel